Viktor Georgiyevich Kulikov (5 July 1921 – 28 May 2013) was the Warsaw Pact commander-in-chief from 1977 to 1989. He was awarded the rank of the Marshal of the Soviet Union on 14 January 1977.

Kulikov was born into a peasant family and joined the Red Army in 1940. He saw service in World War II and was made a Hero of the Soviet Union. 

Kulikov commanded the Kyiv Military District in 1967–1969 and the Group of Soviet Forces in Germany in 1969–1971. From 1971 until 1977, he served as the Chief of General Staff of the Soviet Armed Forces. In 1983, he was awarded a Lenin Prize. Kulikov was a member of the Soviet/Russian parliament 1989–2003. He was awarded the highest Cuban award, the Order of Playa Girón in 2006.

Kulikov died after an extended illness in 2013.

Honours and awards
USSR and Russia
 Hero of the Soviet Union (3 July 1981)
 Order of Merit for the Fatherland;
2nd class II degrees (10 July 2001) - for outstanding contribution to strengthening national defence and an active law-making
3rd class (3 July 1996) - for services to the state and personal contribution to the development and reform of the Armed Forces of the Russian Federation
4th class (23 June 2011) - a contribution to strengthening national defence and long-term public activities
 Order of Military Merit
 Order of Honour (5 July 2006) - for services to strengthen national defence and a lot of work on patriotic education of young people
 Four Orders of Lenin (2 July 1971, 21 February 1978, 3 July 1981 and 19 February 1988)
 Order of the Red Banner, three times (26 October 1943, 20 July 1944 and 22 February 1968)
 Order of the Patriotic War, 1st class, three times (7 September 1943, 12 May 1945 and 6 April 1985)
 Order of the Red Star (26 October 1955)
 Order for Service to the Homeland in the Armed Forces of the USSR, 3rd class (30 April 1975)
 Medal For Courage
 Medal for Combat Service
 Lenin Prize (1983)
 An individual weapon - a gun (on retirement in 1992)

Foreign awards
 Order of Sukhbaatar (Mongolia, 1981)
 Patriotic Order of Merit, 1st class (GDR, 1981)
 Star of People's Friendship, 1st class (GDR, 1985)
 Scharnhorst Order, three times (GDR, 1972, 1986, 1987)
 Order "For Service to the Motherland and the people", 1st class (GDR, 1970)
 Order of Georgi Dimitrov (Bulgaria, 1984)
 Order "The People's Republic of Bulgaria", 1st class (1974)
 Commander's Cross with Star of the Order of Polonia Restituta (Poland, 1973)
 Order Banner IRR with diamonds (Hungary, 1975)
 Order of the Red Star (Hungary, 1985)
 Order "For Military Valour", 1st class (NRW, 1983)
 Order of the Victorious February (Czechoslovakia, 1985)
 Order "For Military Merit", 1st class (Peru, 1972)
 Order "On 23 August", 1st class (CPP, 1974)

References

External links 
 Text of a 2005 interview
 Biografia in Russian

1921 births
2013 deaths
People from Oryol Oblast
Central Committee of the Communist Party of the Soviet Union members
United Russia politicians
Seventh convocation members of the Supreme Soviet of the Soviet Union
Eighth convocation members of the Supreme Soviet of the Soviet Union
Ninth convocation members of the Supreme Soviet of the Soviet Union
Tenth convocation members of the Supreme Soviet of the Soviet Union
Eleventh convocation members of the Supreme Soviet of the Soviet Union
Members of the Congress of People's Deputies of the Soviet Union
Third convocation members of the State Duma (Russian Federation)
Marshals of the Soviet Union
Warsaw Treaty Organization people
Military Academy of the General Staff of the Armed Forces of the Soviet Union alumni
Soviet military personnel of World War II
Heroes of the Soviet Union
Recipients of the Order "For Merit to the Fatherland", 2nd class
Commanders with Star of the Order of Polonia Restituta
Recipients of the Order of Polonia Restituta (1944–1989)
Recipients of the Order of Lenin
Recipients of the Order of the Red Star
Recipients of the Order of the Red Banner
Recipients of the Order of Military Merit (Russia)
Recipients of the Order of Honour (Russia)
Recipients of the Medal "For Courage" (Russia)
Lenin Prize winners
Recipients of the Patriotic Order of Merit
Recipients of the Scharnhorst Order
Recipients of the Order of Georgi Dimitrov
Recipients of the Order "For Merit to the Fatherland", 3rd class
Recipients of the Medal of Zhukov
Recipients of the Medal "For Distinction in Guarding the State Border of the USSR"
Frunze Military Academy alumni